Roland Iljadhi (born 18 August 1963) is an Albanian retired footballer, who played as a defender for Flamurtari Vlorë.

Club career
A soon as Albanians were free to leave the country after the end of the communist era, Iljadhi moved abroad to play alongside compatriot Alfred Ferko in neighboring Greece for Panachaiki Patras.

International career
He made his debut for Albania in an October 1987 European Championship qualification match against Romania and earned a total of 4 caps, scoring no goals.

His final international was a May 1990 European Championship qualification match against Iceland.

Honours
Albanian Superliga: 1
 1991

References

External links

1963 births
Living people
Footballers from Vlorë
Albanian footballers
Association football defenders
Albania international footballers
Flamurtari Vlorë players
Panachaiki F.C. players
Kategoria Superiore players
Super League Greece players
Albanian expatriate footballers
Expatriate footballers in Greece
Albanian expatriate sportspeople in Greece